Kadyrgulovo (Qaźırğol) is a rural locality (a village) and the administrative centre of Kadyrgulovsky Selsoviet, Davlekanovsky District, Bashkortostan, Russia. The population was 234 as of 2010.

Geography 
Kadyrgulovo is located 41 km southeast of Davlekanovo (the district's administrative centre) by road. Gumerovo is the nearest rural locality.

References 

Rural localities in Davlekanovsky District